Melleh-ye Gurab (also Romanized as Melleh-ye Gūrāb and Meleh-ye Gūrāb) is a village in Mongasht Rural District, in the Central District of Bagh-e Malek County, Khuzestan Province, Iran. At the 2006 census, its population was 63, in 11 families.

References 

Populated places in Bagh-e Malek County